Moylgrove, also spelled Moylegrove, is a village and parish in north Pembrokeshire, Wales, about  from Cardigan, in the community of Nevern.

Description
The placename "Moylegrove" means "Matilda's Grove"; "Matilda" may have been the wife of a Norman lord of the manor. The Welsh placename may mean "Irishman's farm" or "grove farm".

The parish is in the Pembrokeshire Coast National Park. Its population is predominantly Welsh-speaking.

Ceibwr Bay, owned by the National Trust and on the Pembrokeshire Coast Path, is a favourite walking and picnicking site for both locals and holiday makers, with spectacular cliff scenery.

History
The Welsh name of the parish, Trevethel, appears on a 1578 parish map of Pembrokeshire.

Moylgrove was described by Samuel Lewis in 1833 as a parish of enclosed arable land and pasture with some 400 inhabitants. It is served by the church of Ss Andrew and Mynno which is about half a mile to the east of the village centre. Bethel Independent chapel was built in the village before 1800 (possibly as early as 1691) and rebuilt from 1850; a Baptist chapel was built in 1894. At that time the parish was in the Hundred of Cemais and the commote of Is Nyfer.

Leisure
This location is used for adventurous activities such as coasteering and sea kayaking in which the participants may encounter the local grey seal family while on the cliffs.
There a short walk to the Witches Cauldron where bottlenose dolphins can be seen. The Witches Cauldron is a collapsed cave which is fed by the tide and sometimes accessed by coasteering groups.

References

External links 
Moylegrove village website
Further historical information and links on GENUKI

Villages in Pembrokeshire